The artistic roller skating events at the 2009 World Games in Kaohsiung was played between 21 and 22 July. 34 roller skaters, from 13 nations, participated in the tournament. The artistic roller skating competition took place at I-Shou University Gymnasium.

Participating nations

Medal table

Events

References

External links
 World Skate
 Roller sports on IWGA website
 Results

 
2009 World Games
2009